Plaga zombie: zona mutante is a 2001 Argentine horror film written and directed Pablo Parés and Hernán Sáez, who star in the film along with Berta Muñiz. It is the second entry in the Plaga Zombie film series and the sequel to the 1997 film Plaga Zombie. It was followed by the third and final film, Plaga Zombie: Revolución Tóxica (2012).

Cast
 Berta Muñiz as John West
 Pablo Parés as Bill Johnson
 Hernán Sáez as Max Giggs
 Paulo Soria as Max Fan
 Esteban Podetti as James Dana
 Sebastian Tabany as Rebelde
 Alejandro Nagy as FBI chief
 Daniel de la Vega as Lider Rebelde
 Nicanor Loreti as Zombie
 Luis Emilio Lucchesi as Chico Escupida
 Germán Magariños as Zombie
 Martin Villagra as Zombie (as Carlos Manuel Horazzi)

External links
 

2001 films
2000s Spanish-language films
2001 horror films
Argentine zombie films
Argentine horror films
2000s Argentine films